Prasada (Sanskrit: प्रसाद), Prasadam or Prasad is a religious offering in Hinduism. Most often Prasada is vegetarian food especially cooked for devotees after praise and thanksgiving to a god. Mahaprasada (also called Bhandarā), is the consecrated food offered to the deity in a Hindu temple which is then distributed and partaken by all the devotees regardless of any orientation.

Prasada is closely linked to the term Naivedya, also spelt Naivedhya, naibedya or Naived(h)yam. The food offered to God is called Naivedya, while the sacred food sanctified and returned by God as a blessing is called Prasada.

Etymology

Prasāda is derived from the verb prasād which consists of the verb सद् (sad - to sit, dwell) which is prefixed with प्र (pra - before, afore, in front) and used as finite verb प्रसीदति (prasīdati - dwells, presides, pleases or favours etc.). It denotes anything, typically food, that is first offered to a deity or saint and then distributed in His or Her name to their followers or others as a good sign.

'Prasāda' is sometimes translated as gift or grace.

Practices
The prasada is to be consumed by attendees as a holy offering. The offerings may include cooked food, fruits and confectionery sweets. Vegetarian food is usually offered and later distributed to the devotees who are present in the temple. Sometimes this vegetarian offering will exclude prohibited items such as garlic, onion, mushroom, etc.

Non-vegetarian is prohibited in some of the temples. Hindu goddesses like Chandi, Kali and Hindu gods like Bhairava, Mahakala are given meat offerings of animals like roosters, goats, fish, buffalo which are slaughtered in the temple precincts.

Offering of food items forms part of the upachara or services to a Hindu deity in many Hindu traditions but is not universal. The murti (icon) is revered as a living entity who is offered food, fruits, and betelnut among others. 

Temples usually have stricter worship routines that include offering naivedya multiple times a day. Most temples allow only trained pujaris to cook the naivedya. The naivedya offered directly to the deity is considered as prasada, the deity having "enjoyed" it. This can be considered to be a symbolic rather than a literal offering.

Offerings of food in home shrines are relatively simpler than the Hindu temples. A common practice is to mix the prasada back into the remaining food before partaking it.

Tasting during preparation or eating the naivedya food before offering it to God is strictly forbidden. The food is first placed before a deity and specific prayers are offered with accompanying rituals. Afterwards, the food is considered as having been blessed by God, and has officially become the sanctified prasada.

In its material sense, prasada is created by a process of giving and receiving between a human devotee and the god. For example, a devotee makes an offering of a material substance such as flowers, fruits, or sweets. The deity then 'enjoys' or tastes a bit of the offering. This now-divinely invested substance is called prasada and is received by the devotee to be ingested, worn, etc. It may be the same material that was originally offered or material offered by others and then re-distributed to other devotees. In many temples, several kinds of prasada (e.g., nuts, sweets) are distributed to the devotees. 

Offering food and subsequently receiving prasada is central to the practice of puja. Any food that is offered either physically to the image of God or silently in prayer is considered prasada.

In Sikhism, karah parshad is served to the congregation after prayer and reading of scripture. Parshad represents the same values as langar in that it is served indiscriminately.

Kurukshetra Prasadam (Channa laddu) in 48 kos parikrama of Kurukshetra, Tirupati Laddu and Mathura peda in the Braj Parikrama are geo-specialty prasada.

See also
 Bhog
 Kripa

References

External links

Objects used in Hindu worship
Puja (Hinduism)
Sanskrit words and phrases
Sikh practices
Religious food and drink
Food and drink in Hinduism